A gewog ( geok, block), in the past also spelled as geog, is a group of villages in Bhutan. The head of a gewog is called a gup ( gepo). Gewogs form a geographic administrative unit below dzongkhag districts (and dungkhag subdistricts, where they exist), and above Dzongkhag Thromde class B and Yenlag Thromde municipalities. Dzongkhag Thromde class A municipalities have their own independent local government body.

Bhutan comprises 205 gewogs, which average  in area. The gewogs in turn are divided into chewogs for elections and thromdes "municipalities" for administration. The Parliament of Bhutan passed legislation in 2002 and 2007 on the status, structure, and leadership of local governments, including gewogs. The most recent legislation by parliament regarding gewogs is the Local Government Act of Bhutan 2009. In July 2011, the government slated 11 gewogs across Bhutan for reorganization, including both mergers and bifurcations, to be debated in dzongkhag local governments. These changes are contemplated to promote ease of travel to gewog capitals and to equitably allocate development resources.

Gewog administration

Under the Local Government Act of 2009, zepa is head of geog each gewog is administered by a Gewog Tshogde (gewog council), subordinate to the Dzongkhag Tshogdu (district council). The Gewog Tshogde is composed of a Gup (headman), Mangmi (deputy), and between five and eight democratically elected Tshogpas from among villages or village groups. All representatives serve five-year terms, unless the local electorate petitions for an election (by a simple majority of the voting population) to vote no confidence in the local government (by at least two-thirds of the voting population). Representatives must be citizens between the ages of 25 and 65, be a resident of their constituency for at least one year, gain certification by the Election Commission, and otherwise qualify under Electoral Law.

While the Gewog Tshogde has powers to regulate resources, manage public health and safety, and levy taxes on land, grazing, cattle, entertainment, and utilities, the gewog administration and all other local governments are prohibited to pass laws. The gewog administration has jurisdiction over roads, buildings (including architecture), recreational areas, utilities, agriculture, and the formulation of local five-year development plans. The Gewog Tshogde also prepares, reports, and expends its own gewog's budget under the supervision and approval of the Minister of Finance.

History

Beginning in the late 1980s, the King of Bhutan, Jigme Singye Wangchuck pursued a long-term programme of decentralization. In 1991, following this principle, the King enacted the first Geog Yargay Tshogchung as a framework for local administration. Under the first Geog Yargay Tshochung, gewogs became official administrative units, each headed by a Gup or headman.  The first-ever elections in Bhutan were held at that time, with a representative from each household voting to select their local Gup.

In 2002, the Parliament of Bhutan enacted a second, more comprehensive Chathrim (Act) also called the Geog Yargay Tshochung. Under the Geog Yargay Tshochung of 2002, gewog administration included the Gup, Mangmi (deputy), Tshogpa (village or village cluster representative), and the non-voting Chupon (village messenger) and Gewog Clerk. Gup and Mangmi sat for three-year terms while normal representatives sat for one year. The body had a two-thirds quorum requirement, and voted by simple majority. The Chathrim of 2002 empowered gewogs to levy rural taxes, maintain and regulate natural resources, and manage community and cultural life.

The Chathrim of 2002 was superseded by the Local Government Act of 2007, which expanded local bureaucracy and vested more powers in gewog administrators, including enforcement of driglam namzha. Under the Act of 2007, additional levels of local administration were carved out from gewogs, namely Dzongkhag Thromde Tshogdes and Gyelyong Thromde Tshogdus. The former were democratically elected bodies under direct dzongkhag management; the latter were democratic autonomous urban areas, or special cities, independent of dzongkhag management. Up through the enactment of the Local Government Act of 2009, gewogs were subdivided administratively into chiwogs, comprising several villages.

Since the Act of 2009, Dzongkhag Thromde Tshogdes, Gyelyong Thromde Tshogdus, and chiwogs have been replaced by thromdes (municipalities) as tertiary administrative divisions. Depending on the population and development of each thromde, it either has an independent bureaucracy ("Class A" Thromdes) or is directly administered by the gewog or dzongkhag ("Class B" and "Dzongkhag Yenlag" Thromdes).

Gewog changes since 2000
In 2002, there were 199 gewogs in Bhutan's 20 dzongkhags; by 2005, there were 205.

In Tsirang District, Chanautey, Gairigaun, Tshokhana, and Tsirang Dangra Gewogs were disestablished; in the meanwhile Barshong, Rangthangling, Tsholingkhar, and Tsirangtoe Gewogs were created. Likewise, in Sarpang District, Sarpangtar Gewog was disestablished. Chukha District no longer contains Bhulajhora Gewog, but now contains Sampheling Gewog. Samtse District no longer contains Ghumauney, Mayona, and Nainital Gewogs; it now contains Ugentse and Yoeseltse Gewogs. In Thimphu District, Bapbi Gewog disappeared. In Samdrup Jongkhar District, Bakuli and Hastinapur Gewogs disappeared, replaced by Dewathang, Langchenphu, Pemathang, Phuntshothang, Serthi, and Wangphu Gewogs. Trashiyangtse District saw the creation of three additional gewogs: Bumdeling, Khamdang, and Ramjar.

Since 2005, gewogs and dzongkhags have continued to evolve. On April 26, 2007, Lhamozingkha Dungkhag (subdistrict) was formally transferred from Sarpang Dzongkhag to Dagana Dzongkhag, affecting the town of Lhamozingkha and three constituent gewogs – Lhamoy Zingkha, Deorali and Nichula (Zinchula) – that formed the westernmost part of Sarpang and now form the southernmost part of Dagana.

The gewogs of Bhutan
The following is a list of 205 gewogs of Bhutan by dzongkhag in a chronological order:

See also
Dzongkhag
Dungkhag
Chiwog
Local Government Act of Bhutan 2009
List of terms for country subdivisions

References

External links
, listing 199 Gewogs existing through 2002.
, listing 205 Gewogs according to a census in 2005.
 reporting Nganglam Gewog in 2010, absent in older gewog lists.

 
Bhutan, Gewogs
Bhutan 2
Bhutan geography-related lists